Claudio Wernli (born 21 July 1942) is a Chilean alpine skier. He competed in two events at the 1964 Winter Olympics.

References

1942 births
Living people
Chilean male alpine skiers
Olympic alpine skiers of Chile
Alpine skiers at the 1964 Winter Olympics
Sportspeople from Santiago
20th-century Chilean people